Little Woodhull Lake is a lake located west of Atwell, New York. Lily Lake is located northwest of the lake, and drains south via an unnamed creek into Little Woodhull Lake. Fish species present in the lake are white sucker, brown bullhead, and brook trout. There is a trail on the east shore off North Lake Road.

References

Lakes of Herkimer County, New York
Lakes of New York (state)